The 2020 Nebraska Republican presidential primary took place on May 13, 2020 in the Republican Party primaries for the 2020 presidential election. The primary was a closed primary (only open to party members) although unenrolled voters were permitted to enroll in a party at the polls with same day registration.

Results

See also
 2020 Nebraska Democratic presidential primary
 Nebraska Republican presidential primary results

References

Republican primary
Nebraska
May 2020 events in the United States
Nebraska Republican primaries